The Newtown Jetettes was founded in 2005 Newtown Jetettes Women's Rugby League Club are an Australian professional Women's rugby league football team based in Newtown, New South Wales, a suburb of south-eastern Sydney. Newtown have Affiliations with the Newtown Jets and they play in the Sydney Metropolitan Women's Rugby League.

See also

List of rugby league clubs in Australia

References

External links

Women's rugby league teams in Australia
Rugby league teams in Sydney
Newtown Jets
Rugby clubs established in 2005
2005 establishments in Australia